The 37th Legislative Assembly of Ontario, Canada's most populous province, was in session from June 8, 1999, until May 5, 2003. Its membership was set by the general election of 1999. Majority was held by the Ontario Progressive Conservative Party led by Mike Harris.

During the 36th Legislative Assembly of Ontario, Harris' government had passed legislation which realigned provincial electoral districts to match the boundaries in use for federal districts; accordingly, the 37th Assembly had a reduced number of seats, with just 103 members compared to 130 in the previous session.

In the March 2002 leadership convention, following Mike Harris' resignation announcement, Ernie Eves was elected party leader.

Gary Carr served as speaker for the assembly.

Members

Notes

References
Members in Parliament 37

Terms of the Legislative Assembly of Ontario
1999 establishments in Ontario
2003 disestablishments in Ontario